Carlos Ibargüen Parra (born October 29, 1990) is a Colombian professional footballer who last played for Atlético Vega Real.

References

External links
 
 
 

Living people
1990 births
Colombian footballers
Colombian expatriate footballers
Association football forwards
La Equidad footballers
C.D. Veracruz footballers
Categoría Primera A players
Colombian expatriate sportspeople in Mexico
Colombian expatriate sportspeople in the Dominican Republic
Expatriate footballers in Mexico
Expatriate footballers in the Dominican Republic
Footballers from Medellín